Szeliga - is a Polish Coat of Arms. It was used by several szlachta families in the times of the Polish–Lithuanian Commonwealth.

History

One of the oldest Polish coats of arms. First reported in a heraldic inventory dated 1464–1480 "Insignia seu clenodia Regis et Regni Poloniae" by Polish historian Jan Długosz, who noted it as a genuine Polish coat of arms.  This medieval historian noted information about Szeliga among the oldest 71 Polish coats of arms saying: "Scheliga lunam defectuosam ceruleam, in cuius medio crux eminet, in campo rubeo defert Genus Polonicum in Yenerem pronunt" [1].

Blazon
In the sanguine field there is a golden crescent with a golden cross dominating it. In the crest a peacock's tail or feathers.

Notable bearers

Notable bearers of this Coat of Arms include:
 Antoni Magier, professor of university, physicist, meteorologist

See also

 Polish heraldry
 Heraldry
 Coat of Arms
 List of Polish nobility coats of arms

External links

Sources 
 :pl:Szeliga (herb szlachecki)#CITEREFCelichowski1885 Zygmunt Celichowski: Jan Długosz, "Insignia seu clenodia regis et regni Poloniae. Z kodeksu kórnickiego." Poznań: Zygmunt Celichowski, 1885
 Dynastic Genealogy 
 Ornatowski.com 

Polish coats of arms